Sir Richard Mathias, 1st Baronet (1 June 1863 – 26 October 1942) was a Liberal Party politician in the United Kingdom.  He was elected at the December 1910 general election as Member of Parliament (MP) for Cheltenham, but was subsequently unseated on petition. His brother was the Liberal candidate at the resulting by-election in April 1911, but lost by four votes to the Conservative Party candidate, former MP Sir James Agg-Gardner.

He was made a baronet on 28 June 1917, of Vaendre Hall, Monmouthshire.

In 1918 he was made a Deputy Lieutenant of Monmouthshire and was Sheriff of Monmouthshire in 1923.

In 1922 he contested the general election as an Independent candidate for Merthyr losing to the Labour candidate in a 2-way contest.

See also
List of United Kingdom MPs with the shortest service

References

External links 
 

1863 births
1942 deaths
Baronets in the Baronetage of the United Kingdom
Deputy Lieutenants of Monmouthshire
High Sheriffs of Monmouthshire
Liberal Party (UK) MPs for English constituencies
UK MPs 1910–1918
Politics of Cheltenham